Katherine Marie Helmond (July 5, 1929 – February 23, 2019) was an American actress. Over her five decades of television acting, she was known for her starring role as Jessica Tate on the sitcom Soap (1977–1981) and her co-starring role as Mona Robinson on Who's the Boss? (1984–1992). Helmond also appeared in a 1993 episode of The Upper Hand, the British version of Who's the Boss?. She also played Doris Sherman on Coach and Lois Whelan (the mother of Debra Barone) on Everybody Loves Raymond. She also appeared as a guest on several talk and variety shows.

Helmond had minor or supporting roles in films such as Alfred Hitchcock's Family Plot (1976), Terry Gilliam's Time Bandits (1981) and Brazil (1985), and Garry Marshall's Overboard (1987). She also voiced Lizzie in the Cars film franchise by Disney/Pixar between 2006 and 2017.

Early life
Helmond was born on July 5, 1929, in Galveston, Texas, the only child of Thelma (née Malone) and Joseph P. Helmond. She was raised by her mother and grandmother, both devout Catholics. She attended a Catholic primary school and appeared in school plays.

For a semester, she attended Bob Jones University in Greenville, South Carolina, and appeared in its film (Unusual Films Production) Wine of Morning.

Career
After her stage debut in As You Like It, Helmond began working in New York City in 1955. She later ran a summer theatre in the Catskills for three seasons and taught acting in university theatre programs. She made her television debut in 1962, but did not achieve a high profile until the 1970s. She also acted on stage, earning a Tony award nomination for her performance on Broadway in Eugene O'Neill's The Great God Brown (1973).  Her other appearances in  Broadway productions included roles in  Private Lives, Don Juan, and Mixed Emotions.

Helmond appeared in such feature films as Family Plot (1976), Time Bandits (1981), and Brazil (1985), in which she played the mother of Jonathan Pryce's character. In 1983, she studied at the American Film Institute's Directing Workshop. She picked up Emmy nominations for her role as Mona Robinson in Who's the Boss and as Lois Whelan in Everybody Loves Raymond. She also received acclaim for her stage performance in Eve Ensler's The Vagina Monologues.

Helmond appeared in The Legend of Lizzie Borden (1975) as Emma Borden, the title character's sister. She appeared in an episode of the short-lived 1976 CBS adventure series, Spencer's Pilots, starring Gene Evans. Helmond gained prominence as Jessica Tate, the ditzy matriarch of the Tate family in Soap (1977–1981) on ABC. From 1984 to 1992, she played the role of Mona Robinson on the ABC sitcom Who's the Boss?.

From 1995 to 1997, she starred in the ABC sitcom Coach as Doris Sherman, eccentric owner of the fictional Orlando Breakers professional football team. From 1996 to 2004, she had a recurring role on Everybody Loves Raymond as Lois Whelan (Ray Barone's mother-in-law). On July 25, 2010, she guest-starred on A&E Network's The Glades and as Caroline Bellefleur on HBO's True Blood.

Award nominations
Helmond was nominated for Broadway's 1973 Tony Award as Best Supporting or Featured Actress (Dramatic) for Eugene O'Neill's The Great God Brown. She was nominated for an Emmy for her role on Soap four times in a row (1978–1981) as Best Actress in a Comedy Series. In 1988 and 1989, she was nominated as Best Supporting Actress in a Comedy Series for her role on Who's the Boss?. In 2002, she was nominated as Guest Actress in a Comedy Series for her role in Everybody Loves Raymond. She won two Golden Globe awards for Who's the Boss? and Soap.

Personal life
In 1957, Helmond married George N. Martin. After their divorce in 1962, she married her second husband, David Christian; they remained married until her death, residing in Los Angeles, New York City, Long Island, and London. She and Christian had a history as students of Zen.

Death
Helmond died on February 23, 2019, from complications of Alzheimer's disease at her home in Los Angeles, aged 89. Her death was announced a week later.

Selected filmography

Film

Television

References

External links

 
 
 
 
 

1929 births
2019 deaths
Age controversies
20th-century American actresses
21st-century American actresses
Actresses from Texas
American film actresses
American stage actresses
American television actresses
American voice actresses
Best Musical or Comedy Actress Golden Globe (television) winners
Best Supporting Actress Golden Globe (television) winners
Bob Jones University alumni
Deaths from dementia in California
Deaths from Alzheimer's disease
People from Galveston, Texas